Buckville is an unincorporated community in Garland County, Arkansas, United States. It is located on hillsides within the Ouachita National Forest. Originally, Buckville was located further down in the valley nearer the Ouachita River; however, with the construction of Blakely Mountain Dam and subsequent filling of Lake Ouachita, the old village was flooded out and a new place was built higher along the hillside.

See also
Buckville Cemetery

Sources
Rand-McNally World Atlas, 2009 Edition, p. 10
Haymond's Complete World Atlas, 1952 Edition, p. 160.

External links
Buckville (Garland County) Encyclopedia of Arkansas

Unincorporated communities in Garland County, Arkansas
Unincorporated communities in Arkansas